The January 1875 Dublin University by-election was held on 18–22 January 1875. The by-election was held due to the resignation of the incumbent Conservative MP, John Thomas Ball on his appointment as Lord Chancellor of Ireland. It was won by the Conservative candidate Edward Gibson.

 Walker recorded the vote tally as above, but the electorate he also included was a lower number - at 2,438 - and so this result may be inaccurate.

References

1875 elections in the United Kingdom
By-elections to the Parliament of the United Kingdom in Dublin University
January 1875 events
1875 elections in Ireland